Gordon College, also known as Dalubhasaang Gordon in Filipino, is a local government-funded college in Olongapo City, Philippines. It was founded on February 24, 1999, by virtue of City Ordinance No. 9, and is composed of four constituent colleges: College of Computer Studies, College of Business and Accountancy, College of Education, and College of Allied Health and Sciences. Other academic units include the Department of Vocational Technology, Faculty of Arts and Sciences, Center for Research and Development, and Institute of Graduate Studies.

Academic programs

Graduate Studies
Master of Arts in Nursing
Master of Arts in Education major in Educational Management
Master in Business Management
Master in Public Management

Undergraduate Courses
Bachelor of Science in Nursing
Bachelor of Elementary Education
Bachelor of Secondary Education
Major in:
English
Mathematics
Biological Science
Social Studies
Music, Arts and Physical Education (MAPE)
Filipino
Bachelor of Arts in Communication
Bachelor of Science in Accountancy (5 years)
Bachelor of Science in Accounting Technology (4 years)
Bachelor of Science in Customs Administration
Bachelor of Science in Business Administration (formerly Business Management)
Bachelor of Science in Hotel and Restaurant Management (4 years)
Bachelor of Science in Computer Science
Bachelor of Science in Tourism Management (4 Years)
Bachelor of Science in Information Technology
Associate in Computer Technology (2 years)
Graduate of Midwifery

K-12 Curriculum 
 Senior High School

See also
 Alculympics
 Association of Local Colleges and Universities
 Pamantasan

External links
 
 
 City Report of Ologapo
 olongapocity.gov.ph

Local colleges and universities in the Philippines
Universities and colleges in Olongapo